Cliniodes festivalis is a moth in the family Crambidae. It was described by James E. Hayden in 2011. It is found in northern Colombia, where it has been recorded from Sierra Nevada de Santa Marta.

The forewing costa is reddish brown and the basal area is reddish brown with black. The antemedial line is black with violet scales and the medial area has an orange anterior and a violet posterior. The hindwings are translucent white with black marginal band. Adults have been recorded on wing in January, February and from July to September.

Etymology
The species name refers to the colorful maculation and is derived from Latin festivus (meaning joyous).

References

Moths described in 2011
Eurrhypini